Julian Schieber (born 13 February 1989) is a German retired footballer who played as a striker.

Club career

VfB Stuttgart
Schieber made his Bundesliga debut in a match at Energie Cottbus on 6 December 2008. On 21 January 2009, he extended his contract at VfB Stuttgart until the summer of 2011.

In February 2009, Schieber played his first international (UEFA Cup) match for Stuttgart against FC Zenit St. Petersburg. On 15 August 2009, he scored his first Bundesliga goal in the Baden-Württemberg derby against SC Freiburg (final score 4–2). He also scored twice on 26 September 2009 in a match in Frankfurt am Main against Eintracht Frankfurt (final score 3–0).

In July 2010, Schieber was loaned out to 1. FC Nürnberg until the end of the season.

Borussia Dortmund
In the 2012–13 season, Schieber moved to Borussia Dortmund. On 4 December 2012, he scored his first European goal in a 1–0 win for Dortmund against Manchester City. In April 2013, Schieber scored two goals in a 4–2 win for Dortmund against FC Augsburg.

On 27 July 2013, Schieber won the 2013 DFL-Supercup with Dortmund 4–2 against rivals Bayern Munich.

Hertha BSC
On 3 July 2014, he signed a 4-year contract with Hertha BSC. He scored his first goal in a 4–2 win against FC Viktoria Köln on 16 August 2014.

On 13 December, he scored the only goal of the game in a victory over his former club Dortmund, which pushed them into a relegation play-off place.

International career
Schieber made his debut for the German under-21 team on 4 September 2009, against San Marino, he scored twice in a 6–0 win.

Career statistics

1.Includes German Cup.
2.Includes UEFA Champions League and UEFA Europa League.
3.Includes German Super Cup.

Honours

Club
 Borussia Dortmund
DFL-Supercup: 2013
UEFA Champions League Runners-up: 2012–13

References

External links
 
 

Living people
1989 births
German footballers
Germany under-21 international footballers
Association football forwards
Bundesliga players
3. Liga players
Regionalliga players
VfB Stuttgart players
VfB Stuttgart II players
1. FC Nürnberg players
Borussia Dortmund players
Borussia Dortmund II players
Hertha BSC players
Hertha BSC II players
FC Augsburg players
People from Backnang
Sportspeople from Stuttgart (region)
Footballers from Baden-Württemberg